Arthur Goddard may refer to:

 Arthur Goddard (footballer) (1876–1956), footballer who played for Liverpool
 Arthur Goddard (engineer) (1921–2022), British engineer who developed the Land Rover